Kim Sang-Rok  (born February 25, 1979) is a South Korean football player who currently plays for Bucheon FC 1995 in the K League.

Club career statistics

External links
 

1979 births
Living people
Association football midfielders
South Korean footballers
Pohang Steelers players
Gimcheon Sangmu FC players
Jeju United FC players
Incheon United FC players
Busan IPark players
Ulsan Hyundai Mipo Dockyard FC players
Bucheon FC 1995 players
K League 1 players
Korea National League players
K League 2 players
Korea University alumni